was a Japanese racing car driver.

Career

During the 1980s, he competed in several Fuji Grand Champion Series races. Ogawa won the 1989 All Japan Formula 3000 Championship and finished 2nd in the same championship in 1990. In the same year, teaming up with Masanori Sekiya, he won the JAF Grand Prix All Japan Fuji 500km, held at Fuji. In 1992, he won the first round of the World Sportscar Championship in Monza in C1, partnering Geoff Lees.

Complete Japanese Formula 3 results
(key) (Races in bold indicate pole position) (Races in italics indicate fastest lap)

Japanese Formula 3000 Championship results
(key) (Races in bold indicate pole position) (Races in italics indicate fastest lap)

24 Hours of Le Mans results

Death

Ogawa was killed in an accident on lap 27 of an All-Japan Formula 3000 race held at Suzuka in May 1992. Ogawa aimed to overtake Andrew Gilbert-Scott's car on the main straight, but the latter held his position while Ogawa moved slightly to the side. He clipped the rear left wheel and the front of his car became lodged in the rear bodywork. Both went down the straight at speed and went into the gravel trap, which was insufficient in slowing down either car. Gilbert-Scott spun, hit the tyre wall and flipped, landing upside-down. Ogawa went in nose-first, hit a mound in the gravel trap and was launched over the tyre barrier, hitting a high-fence supporting pole.  Both cars were wrecked and the race was stopped immediately. As a result of the accident at least one cameraman, several photographers, and Gilbert-Scott all sustained injuries. Ogawa was freed but had suffered severe leg, head and neck injuries and was pronounced dead on the way to hospital.

References

1956 births
1992 deaths
Japanese racing drivers
Japanese Formula 3000 Championship drivers
Japanese Formula 3 Championship drivers
Racing drivers who died while racing
People from Okazaki, Aichi
Sport deaths in Japan
24 Hours of Le Mans drivers
World Sportscar Championship drivers
Long Distance Series drivers
TOM'S drivers
Japanese Sportscar Championship drivers